The list of video game consoles is split into the following articles:

 List of dedicated video game consoles
 List of handheld game consoles
 List of home video game consoles
 List of first generation home video game consoles
 List of microconsoles
 List of video game console emulators
 List of retro style video game consoles
 List of best-selling game consoles
 List of best-selling game consoles by region
 List of PowerPC-based game consoles

See also 
 List of accessories to video games by system
 List of game controllers

 
Consoles